E125 may refer to:
 European route E125
 Scarlet GN or C.I. Food Red 1, Ponceau SX, FD&C Red No. 4, or C.I. 14700, a red azo dye once used as a food dye
 Element 125, unbipentium, a predicted chemical element; see Extended periodic table § Superactinides